Jiao Xian (475-221 BC), courtesy name Xiaoran or Xiaoruo, also called Jiao Guang, was born in Hedong and lived his life in Guanzhong (关中) during the Warring States period, a period with constant warfare. In the beginning of his life Jiao tried to avoid the war but when he was just over 20 years old he lost everything he had because of the warfare. This drives him mad and he started to live as an animal, wearing no clothes and sleeping on the floor in nature. He spoke to no one during the entire year. He lived a sober life and became a hermit. It has been said that he lived for more than 100 years.

Bibliography 
The story of Jiao Xiaoran made him to a special person and that way he came into the Weilüe, written by Yu Huan, there is also a record of Jiao in the Records of the Three Kingdoms (VOL 11) "Guan Ning Biography" by Chen Shou and the Taiping Guangji by Li Fang.
The behaviour of Jiao is being evaluated by scholars and psychologists, Huangfu Mi describs Jiao's behaviour as a natural response to the situation.

Jiao Xiaoran is depict in the Wu Shuang Pu (無雙譜, Table of Peerless Heroes) by Jin Guliang. The images (and poems) for this 17thC book were widely spread and often reused, including on porcelain art or objects

References 

Legendary Chinese people
Chinese hermits